The 1914 All-Ireland Senior Football Championship was the 28th staging of Ireland's premier Gaelic football knock-out competition. Kerry were the winners.

Results

Connacht Senior Football Championship

Leinster Senior Football Championship

Munster Senior Football Championship

Ulster Senior Football Championship

All-Ireland Senior Football Championship

Championship statistics

Miscellaneous
 Kerry win their second two in a row as All Ireland champions.

References